The Rigveda or Rig Veda (from  "praise" and  "knowledge") is an ancient Indian collection of Vedic Sanskrit hymns (sūktas). It is one of the four sacred canonical Hindu texts (śruti) known as the Vedas. Only one Shakha of the many survive today, namely the Śakalya Shakha. Much of the contents contained in the remaining Shakhas are now lost or are not available in the public forum.

The Rigveda is the oldest known Vedic Sanskrit text. Its early layers are among the oldest extant texts in any Indo-European language. The sounds and texts of the Rigveda have been orally transmitted since the 2nd millennium BCE. Philological and linguistic evidence indicates that the bulk of the Rigveda Samhita was composed in the northwestern region of the Indian subcontinent (see Rigvedic rivers), most likely between  1500 and 1000 BCE, although a wider approximation of  19001200 BCE has also been given.

The text is layered, consisting of the Samhita, Brahmanas, Aranyakas and Upanishads. The Rigveda Samhita is the core text and is a collection of 10 books (s) with 1,028 hymns (s) in about 10,600 verses (called , eponymous of the name Rigveda). In the eight booksBooks 2 through 9that were composed the earliest, the hymns predominantly discuss cosmology, rites, and rituals and praise deities. The more recent books (Books 1 and 10) in part also deal with philosophical or speculative questions, virtues such as dāna (charity) in society, questions about the origin of the universe and the nature of the divine, and other metaphysical issues in their hymns.

Some of its verses continue to be recited during Hindu prayer and celebration of rites of passage (such as weddings), making it probably the world's oldest religious text in continued use.

Dating and historical context

Dating
According to Jamison and Brereton, in their 2014 translation of the Rigveda, the dating of this text "has been and is likely to remain a matter of contention and reconsideration". The dating proposals so far are all inferred from the style and the content within the hymns themselves. Philological estimates tend to date the bulk of the text to the second half of the second millennium BCE. Being composed in an early Indo-Aryan language, the hymns must post-date the Indo-Iranian separation, dated to roughly 2000 BCE. A reasonable date close to that of the composition of the core of the Rigveda is that of the Mitanni documents of northern Syria and Iraq (c. 14501350 BCE), which also mention the Vedic gods such as Varuna, Mitra and Indra. Other evidence also points to a composition close to 1400 BCE.

The Rigvedas core is accepted to date to the late Bronze Age, making it one of the few examples with an unbroken tradition. Its composition is usually dated to roughly between c. 1500 and 1000 BCE. According to Michael Witzel, the codification of the Rigveda took place at the end of the Rigvedic period between ca. 1200 and 1000 BCE, in the early Kuru kingdom. Asko Parpola argues that the Rigveda was systematized around 1000 BCE, at the time of the Kuru kingdom.

Historical and societal context
The Rigveda is far more archaic than any other Indo-Aryan text. For this reason, it was in the center of attention of Western scholarship from the times of Max Müller and Rudolf Roth onwards. The Rigveda records an early stage of Vedic religion. There are strong linguistic and cultural similarities with the early Iranian Avesta, "The oldest part of the Avesta... is linguistically and culturally very close to the material preserved in the Rigveda... There seems to be economic and religious interaction and perhaps rivalry operating here, which justifies scholars in placing the Vedic and Avestan worlds in close chronological, geographical and cultural proximity to each other not far removed from a joint Indo-Iranian period." deriving from the Proto-Indo-Iranian times, often associated with the early Andronovo culture (or rather, the Sintashta culture within the early Andronovo horizon) of c. 2000 BCE.

The Rigveda offers no direct evidence of social or political systems in the Vedic era, whether ordinary or elite. Only hints such as cattle raising and horse racing are discernible, and the text offers very general ideas about the ancient Indian society. There is no evidence, state Jamison and Brereton, of any elaborate, pervasive or structured caste system. Social stratification seems embryonic, then and later a social ideal rather than a social reality. The society was semi-nomadic and pastoral with evidence of agriculture since hymns mention plow and celebrate agricultural divinities. There was division of labor and a complementary relationship between kings and poet-priests but no discussion of a relative status of social classes. Women in the Rigveda appear disproportionately as speakers in dialogue hymns, both as mythical or divine Indrani, Apsaras Urvasi, or Yami, as well as Apāla Ātreyī (RV 8.91), Godhā (RV 10.134.6), Ghoṣā Kākṣīvatī (RV 10.39.40), Romaśā (RV 1.126.7), Lopāmudrā (RV 1.179.12), Viśvavārā Ātreyī (RV 5.28), Śacī Paulomī (RV 10.159), Śaśvatī Āṅgirasī (RV 8.1.34). The women of the Rigveda are quite outspoken and appear more sexually confident than men, in the text. Elaborate and aesthetic hymns on wedding suggest rites of passage had developed during the Rigvedic period. There is little evidence of dowry and no evidence of sati in it or related Vedic texts.

The Rigvedic hymns mention rice and porridge, in hymns such as 8.83, 8.70, 8.77 and 1.61 in some versions of the text; however, there is no discussion of rice cultivation. The term áyas (metal) occurs in the Rigveda, but it is unclear which metal it was. Iron is not mentioned in Rigveda, something scholars have used to help date Rigveda to have been composed before 1000 BCE. Hymn 5.63 mentions "metal cloaked in gold", suggesting metal working had progressed in the Vedic culture.

Some of the names of gods and goddesses found in the Rigveda are found amongst other belief systems based on Proto-Indo-European religion, while most of the words used share common roots with words from other Indo-European languages. However, about 300 words in the Rigveda are neither Indo-Aryan nor Indo-European, states the Sanskrit and Vedic literature scholar Frits Staal. Of these 300, manysuch as kapardin, kumara, kumari, kikatacome from Munda or proto-Munda languages found in the eastern and northeastern (Assamese) region of India, with roots in Austroasiatic languages. The others in the list of 300such as mleccha and nirhave Dravidian roots found in the southern region of India, or are of Tibeto-Burman origins. A few non-Indo-European words in the Rigvedasuch as for camel, mustard and donkeybelong to a possibly lost Central Asian language. The linguistic sharing provides clear indications, states Michael Witzel, that the people who spoke Rigvedic Sanskrit already knew and interacted with Munda and Dravidian speakers.

The earliest text were composed in northwestern regions of the Indian subcontinent, and the more philosophical later texts were most likely composed in or around the region that is the modern era state of Haryana.

Text

Composition
The "family books" (27) are associated with various clans and chieftains, containing hymns by members of the same clan in each book; but other clans are also represented in the Rigveda. The family books are associated with specific regions, and mention prominent Bharata and Pūru kings.

Tradition associates a rishi (the composer) with each  (verse) of the Rigveda. Most sūktas are attributed to single composers; for each of them the Rigveda includes a lineage-specific  hymn (a special sūkta of rigidly formulaic structure, used for rituals). In all, 10 families of rishis account for more than 95 per cent of the 

Collection and organisation
The codification of the Rigveda took place late in the Rigvedic or rather in the early post-Rigvedic period at ca. 1200 BCE, by members of the early Kuru tribe, when the center of Vedic culture moved east from the Punjab into what is now Uttar Pradesh. The Rigveda was codified by compiling the hymns, including the arrangement of the individual hymns in ten books, coeval with the composition of the younger Veda Samhitas. According to Witzel, the initial collection took place after the Bharata victory in the Battle of the Ten Kings, under king Sudās, over other Puru kings. This collection was an effort to reconcile various factions in the clans which were united in the Kuru kingdom under a Bharata king. This collection was re-arranged and expanded in the Kuru Kingdom, reflecting the establishment of a new Bharata-Puru lineage and new srauta rituals.

The fixing of the Vedic chant (by enforcing regular application of sandhi) and of the padapatha (by dissolving Sandhi out of the earlier metrical text), occurred during the later Brahmana period, in roughly the 6th century BCE.

The surviving form of the Rigveda is based on an early Iron Age collection that established the core 'family books' (mandalas 27, ordered by author, deity and meter) and a later redaction, coeval with the redaction of the other Vedas, dating several centuries after the hymns were composed. This redaction also included some additions (contradicting the strict ordering scheme) and orthoepic changes to the Vedic Sanskrit such as the regularization of sandhi (termed orthoepische Diaskeuase by Oldenberg, 1888).

Organisation

Mandalas
The text is organized in ten "books", or maṇḍalas ("circles"), of varying age and length. The "family books", mandalas 27, are the oldest part of the Rigveda and the shortest books; they are arranged by length (decreasing length of hymns per book) and account for 38% of the text.

The hymns are arranged in collections each dealing with a particular deity: Agni comes first, Indra comes second, and so on. They are attributed and dedicated to a rishi (sage) and his family of students. Within each collection, the hymns are arranged in descending order of the number of stanzas per hymn. If two hymns in the same collection have equal numbers of stanzas then they are arranged so that the number of syllables in the metre are in descending order. The second to seventh mandalas have a uniform format.

The eighth and ninth mandalas, comprising hymns of mixed age, account for 15% and 9%, respectively. The ninth mandala is entirely dedicated to Soma and the Soma ritual.
The hymns in the ninth mandala are arranged by both their prosody structure (chanda) and by their length.

The first and the tenth mandalas are the youngest; they are also the longest books, of 191 suktas each, accounting for 37% of the text. Nevertheless, some of the hymns in mandalas 8, 1 and 10 may still belong to an earlier period and may be as old as the material in the family books. The first mandala has a unique arrangement not found in the other nine mandalas. The first 84 hymns of the tenth mandala have a structure different than the remaining hymns in it.

Hymns and prosody
Each mandala consists of hymns or s (literally, "well recited, eulogy") intended for various rituals. 
The s in turn consist of individual stanzas called  ("praise", pl. ), which are further analysed into units of verse called  ("foot" or step).

The hymns of the Rigveda are in different poetic metres in Vedic Sanskrit. The trishtubh meter (40%) and gayatri meter (25%) dominate in the Rigveda.A history of Sanskrit Literature, Arthur MacDonell, Oxford University Press/Appleton & Co, p. 56

Transmission
As with the other Vedas, the redacted text has been handed down in several versions, including the Padapatha, in which each word is isolated in pausa form and is used for just one way of memorization; and the Samhitapatha, which combines words according to the rules of sandhi (the process being described in the Pratisakhya) and is the memorized text used for recitation.

The Padapatha and the Pratisakhya anchor the text's true meaning, and the fixed text was preserved with unparalleled fidelity for more than a millennium by oral tradition alone. In order to achieve this the oral tradition prescribed very structured enunciation, involving breaking down the Sanskrit compounds into stems and inflections, as well as certain permutations. This interplay with sounds gave rise to a scholarly tradition of morphology and phonetics.

It is unclear as to when the Rigveda was first written down. The oldest surviving manuscripts have been discovered in Nepal and date to c. 1040 CE. According to Witzel, the Paippalada Samhita tradition points to written manuscripts c. 800-1000 CE. The Upanishads were likely in the written form earlier, about mid-1st millennium CE (Gupta Empire period).Wilhelm Rau (1955), Zur Textkritik der Brhadaranyakopanisad, ZDMG, 105(2), p. 58 Attempts to write the Vedas may have been made "towards the end of the 1st millennium BCE". The early attempts may have been unsuccessful given the Smriti rules that forbade the writing down the Vedas, states Witzel. The oral tradition continued as a means of transmission until modern times.

Recensions

Several shakhas (from skt. śākhā f. "branch", i. e. "recension") of the Rig Veda are known to have existed in the past. Of these, Śākala Śākhā (named after the scholar Śākalya) is the only one to have survived in its entirety. Another śākhā that may have survived is the Bāṣkala, although this is uncertain.Maurice Winternitz (History of Sanskrit Literature, Revised English Translation Edition, 1926, vol. 1, p. 57) says that "Of the different recensions of this Saṃhitā, which once existed, only a single one has come down to us." He adds in a note (p. 57, note 1) that this refers to the "recension of the Śākalaka-School."

The surviving padapāṭha version of the Rigveda text is ascribed to Śākalya. The  recension has 1,017 regular hymns, and an appendix of 11  hymns which are now customarily included in the 8th mandala (as 8.498.59), for a total of 1028 hymns. The  recension includes eight of these  hymns among its regular hymns, making a total of 1025 regular hymns for this śākhā. In addition, the  recension has its own appendix of 98 hymns, the Khilani.

In the 1877 edition of Aufrecht, the 1028 hymns of the Rigveda contain a total of 10,552 s, or 39,831 padas. The Shatapatha Brahmana gives the number of syllables to be 432,000, while the metrical text of van Nooten and Holland (1994) has a total of 395,563 syllables (or an average of 9.93 syllables per pada); counting the number of syllables is not straightforward because of issues with sandhi and the post-Rigvedic pronunciation of syllables like súvar as svàr.

Three other shakhas are mentioned in Caraṇavyuha, a pariśiṣṭa (supplement) of Yajurveda: Māṇḍukāyana, Aśvalāyana and Śaṅkhāyana. The Atharvaveda lists two more shakhas. The differences between all these shakhas are very minor, limited to varying order of content and inclusion (or non-inclusion) of a few verses. The following information is known about the shakhas other than Śākala and Bāṣkala:

 Māṇḍukāyana: Perhaps the oldest of the Rigvedic shakhas.
 Aśvalāyana: Includes 212 verses, all of which are newer than the other Rigvedic hymns.
 Śaṅkhāyana: Very similar to Aśvalāyana
 Saisiriya: Mentioned in the Rigveda Pratisakhya. Very similar to Śākala, with a few additional verses; might have derived from or merged with it.

Manuscripts

The Rigveda hymns were composed and preserved by oral tradition. They were memorized and verbally transmitted with "unparalleled fidelity" across generations for many centuries. According to Barbara West, it was probably first written down about the 3rd-century BCE. The manuscripts were made from birch bark or palm leaves, which decompose and therefore were routinely copied over the generations to help preserve the text.

Versions
There are, for example, 30 manuscripts of Rigveda at the Bhandarkar Oriental Research Institute, collected in the 19th century by Georg Bühler, Franz Kielhorn and others, originating from different parts of India, including Kashmir, Gujarat, the then Rajaputana, Central Provinces etc. They were transferred to Deccan College, Pune, in the late 19th century. They are in the Sharada and Devanagari scripts, written on birch bark and paper. The oldest of the Pune collection is dated to 1464. The 30 manuscripts of Rigveda preserved at the Bhandarkar Oriental Research Institute, Pune were added to UNESCO's Memory of the World Register in 2007.

Of these thirty manuscripts, nine contain the samhita text, five have the padapatha in addition. Thirteen contain Sayana's commentary. At least five manuscripts (MS. no. 1/A1879-80, 1/A1881-82, 331/1883-84 and 5/Viś I) have preserved the complete text of the Rigveda. MS no. 5/1875-76, written on birch bark in bold Sharada, was only in part used by Max Müller for his edition of the Rigveda with Sayana's commentary.

Müller used 24 manuscripts then available to him in Europe, while the Pune Edition used over five dozen manuscripts, but the editors of Pune Edition could not procure many manuscripts used by Müller and by the Bombay Edition, as well as from some other sources; hence the total number of extant manuscripts known then must surpass perhaps eighty at least.

Scripts
Rigveda manuscripts in paper, palm leaves and birch bark form, either in full or in portions, have been discovered in the following Indic scripts:
Devanagari (Rajasthan, Maharashtra, Uttar Pradesh, Nepal)Rigvedasamhita, Rigvedasamhita-Padapatha and Rigvedasamhitabhashya, Memory of the World Register, UNESCO (2006), page 2, Quote: "One manuscript written on birch bark is in the ancient Sharada script and the remaining 29 manuscripts are written in the Devanagari script. All the manuscripts are in Sanskrit language."
Grantha (Tamil Nadu)A copy of the Rigveda samhita Books 1 to 3 in Tamil-Grantha script is preserved at the Cambridge University Sanskrit Manuscript Library (MS Or.2366). This talapatra palm leaf manuscript was likely copied sometime between mid-18th and late-19th-century. Ṛgveda Saṃhitā (MS Or.2366), University of Cambridge, UK
Malayalam (Kerala)
Nandinagari (South India)
Sharada (Kashmir)

Comparison
The various Rigveda manuscripts discovered so far show some differences. Broadly, the most studied Śākala recension has 1017 hymns, includes an appendix of eleven valakhīlya hymns which are often counted with the eighth mandala, for a total of 1028 metrical hymns. The Bāṣakala version of Rigveda includes eight of these vālakhilya hymns among its regular hymns, making a total of 1025 hymns in the main text for this śākhā. The Bāṣakala text also has an appendix of 98 hymns, called the Khilani, bringing the total to 1,123 hymns. The manuscripts of Śākala recension of the Rigveda have about 10,600 verses, organized into ten Books (Mandalas). Books 2 through 7 are internally homogeneous in style, while Books 1, 8 and 10 are compilation of verses of internally different styles suggesting that these books are likely a collection of compositions by many authors.

The first mandala is the largest, with 191 hymns and 2006 verses, and it was added to the text after Books 2 through 9. The last, or the 10th Book, also has 191 hymns but 1754 verses, making it the second largest. The language analytics suggest the 10th Book, chronologically, was composed and added last. The content of the 10th Book also suggest that the authors knew and relied on the contents of the first nine books.

The Rigveda is the largest of the four Vedas, and many of its verses appear in the other Vedas. Almost all of the 1875 verses found in Samaveda are taken from different parts of the Rigveda, either once or as repetition, and rewritten in a chant song form. Books 8 and 9 of the Rigveda are by far the largest source of verses for Sama Veda. Book 10 contributes the largest number of the 1350 verses of Rigveda found in Atharvaveda, or about one fifth of the 5987 verses in the Atharvaveda text. A bulk of 1875 ritual-focussed verses of Yajurveda, in its numerous versions, also borrow and build upon the foundation of verses in Rigveda.Edmund Gosse, New York: Appleton, p. 181

Contents
Altogether the Rigveda consists of:
the Samhita (hymns to the deities, the oldest part of the Rigveda)
the Brahmanas, commentaries on the hymns
the  Aranyakas or "forest books"
the  Upanishads
In western usage, "Rigveda" usually refers to the Rigveda Samhita, while the Brahmanas are referred to as the "Rigveda Brahmanas" (etc.). Technically speaking, however, "the Rigveda" refers to the entire body of texts transmitted along with the Samhita portion. Different bodies of commentary were transmitted in the different shakhas or "schools".
Only a small portion of these texts has been preserved: The texts of only two out of five shakhas mentioned by the Rigveda Pratishakhya have survived.
The late (15th or 16th century) Shri Guru Charitra even claims the existence of twelve Rigvedic shakhas.
The two surviving Rigvedic corpora are those of the  Śākala and the  Bāṣkala shakhas.

Hymns

The Rigvedic hymns are dedicated to various deities, chief of whom are Indra, a heroic god praised for having slain his enemy Vrtra; Agni, the sacrificial fire; and Soma, the sacred potion or the plant it is made from. Equally prominent gods are the Adityas or Asura gods MitraVaruna and Ushas (the dawn). Also invoked are Savitr, Vishnu, Rudra, Pushan, Brihaspati or Brahmanaspati, as well as deified natural phenomena such as Dyaus Pita (the shining sky, Father Heaven), Prithivi (the earth, Mother Earth), Surya (the sun god), Vayu or Vata (the wind), Apas (the waters), Parjanya (the thunder and rain), Vac (the word), many rivers (notably the Sapta Sindhu, and the Sarasvati River). The Adityas, Vasus, Rudras, Sadhyas, Ashvins, Maruts, Rbhus, and the Vishvadevas ("all-gods") as well as the "thirty-three gods" are the groups of deities mentioned.

 Mandala 1 comprises 191 hymns. Hymn 1.1 is addressed to Agni, and his name is the first word of the Rigveda. The remaining hymns are mainly addressed to Agni and Indra, as well as Varuna, Mitra, the Ashvins, the Maruts, Usas, Surya, Rbhus, Rudra, Vayu, Brhaspati, Visnu, Heaven and Earth, and all the Gods. This Mandala is dated to have been added to the Rigveda after Mandala 2 through 9, and includes the philosophical Riddle Hymn 1.164, which inspires chapters in later Upanishads such as the Mundaka.F. Max Müller (1884), The Upanishads, Part 2, Mundaka Upanishad, Oxford University Press, pp. 3840
 Mandala 2 comprises 43 hymns, mainly to Agni and Indra. It is chiefly attributed to the Rishi .
 Mandala 3 comprises 62 hymns, mainly to Agni and Indra and the Vishvedevas. The verse 3.62.10 has great importance in Hinduism as the Gayatri Mantra.
 Mandala 4 comprises 58 hymns, mainly to Agni and Indra as well as the Rbhus, Ashvins, Brhaspati, Vayu, Usas, etc.
 Mandala 5 comprises 87 hymns, mainly to Agni and Indra, the Visvedevas ("all the gods'), the Maruts, the twin-deity Mitra-Varuna and the Asvins. Two hymns each are dedicated to Ushas (the dawn) and to Savitr. Most hymns in this book are attributed to the  clan.
 Mandala 6 comprises 75 hymns, mainly to Agni and Indra, all the gods, Pusan, Ashvin, Usas, etc. Most hymns in this book are attributed to the  family of Angirasas.
 Mandala 7 comprises 104 hymns, to Agni, Indra, the Visvadevas, the Maruts, Mitra-Varuna, the Asvins, Ushas, Indra-Varuna, Varuna, Vayu (the wind), two each to Sarasvati (ancient river/goddess of learning) and Vishnu, and to others.
 Mandala 8 comprises 103 hymns to various gods. Hymns 8.49 to 8.59 are the apocryphal . Hymns 148 and 6066 are attributed to the  clan, the rest to other (Angirasa) poets.
 Mandala 9 comprises 114 hymns, entirely devoted to Soma Pavamana, the cleansing of the sacred potion of the Vedic religion.
 Mandala 10 comprises additional 191 hymns, frequently in later language, addressed to Agni, Indra and various other deities. It contains the Nadistuti sukta which is in praise of rivers and is important for the reconstruction of the geography of the Vedic civilization and the Purusha sukta which has been important in studies of Vedic sociology. It also contains the Nasadiya sukta (10.129) which deals with multiple speculations about the creation of universe, and whether anyone can know the right answer. The marriage hymns (10.85) and the death hymns (10.1018) still are of great importance in the performance of the corresponding Grhya rituals.

Rigveda Brahmanas

"possessed of many verses"), as the followers of the Rigveda are called, two have come down to us, namely those of the Aitareyins and the Kaushitakins. The Aitareya-brahmana and the Kaushitaki- (or Sankhayana-) brahmana evidently have for their groundwork the same stock of traditional exegetic matter. They differ, however, considerably as regards both the arrangement of this matter and their stylistic handling of it, with the exception of the numerous legends common to both, in which the discrepancy is comparatively slight. There is also a certain amount of material peculiar to each of them.

The Kaushitaka is, upon the whole, far more concise in its style and more systematic in its arrangement features which would lead one to infer that it is probably the more modern work of the two. It consists of 30 chapters (adhyaya); while the Aitareya has 40, divided into eight books (or pentads, pancaka), of five chapters each. The last 10 adhyayas of the latter work are, however, clearly a later addition though they must have already formed part of it at the time of Pāṇini (c. 5th century BCE), if, as seems probable, one of his grammatical sutras, regulating the formation of the names of Brahmanas, consisting of 30 and 40 adhyayas, refers to these two works. In this last portion occurs the well-known legend (also found in the Shankhayana-sutra, but not in the Kaushitaki-brahmana) of Shunahshepa, whom his father Ajigarta sells and offers to slay, the recital of which formed part of the inauguration of kings.

While the Aitareya deals almost exclusively with the Soma sacrifice, the Kaushitaka, in its first six chapters, treats of the several kinds of haviryajna, or offerings of rice, milk, ghee, etc., whereupon follows the Soma sacrifice in this way, that chapters 710 contain the practical ceremonial and 1130 the recitations (shastra) of the hotar. Sayana, in the introduction to his commentary on the work, ascribes the Aitareya to the sage Mahidasa Aitareya (i.e. son of Itara), also mentioned elsewhere as a philosopher; and it seems likely enough that this person arranged the Brahmana and founded the school of the Aitareyins. Regarding the authorship of the sister work we have no information, except that the opinion of the sage Kaushitaki is frequently referred to in it as authoritative, and generally in opposition to the Paingya—the Brahmana, it would seem, of a rival school, the Paingins. Probably, therefore, it is just what one of the manuscripts calls it—the Brahmana of Sankhayana (composed) in accordance with the views of Kaushitaki.

Rigveda Aranyakas and Upanishads

Each of these two Brahmanas is supplemented by a "forest book", or Aranyaka. The Aitareyaranyaka is not a uniform production. It consists of five books (aranyaka), three of which, the first and the last two, are of a liturgical nature, treating of the ceremony called mahavrata, or great vow. The last of these books, composed in sutra form, is, however, doubtless of later origin, and is, indeed, ascribed by Hindu authorities either to Shaunaka or to Ashvalayana. The second and third books, on the other hand, are purely speculative, and are also styled the Bahvrca-brahmana-upanishad. Again, the last four chapters of the second book are usually singled out as the Aitareya Upanishad, ascribed, like its Brahmana (and the first book), to Mahidasa Aitareya; and the third book is also referred to as the Samhita-upanishad. As regards the Kaushitaki-aranyaka, this work consists of 15 adhyayas, the first two (treating of the mahavrata ceremony) and the 7th and 8th of which correspond to the first, fifth, and third books of the Aitareyaranyaka, respectively, whilst the four adhyayas usually inserted between them constitute the highly interesting Kaushitaki (Brahmana-) Upanishad, of which we possess two different recensions. The remaining portions (915) of the Aranyaka treat of the vital airs, the internal Agnihotra, etc., ending with the vamsha, or succession of teachers.

Significance
The text is a highly stylized poetical Vedic Sanskrit with praise addressed to the Vedic gods and chieftains. Most hymns, according to Witzel, were intended to be recited at the annual New Year Soma ritual. The text also includes some nonritual poetry, fragments of mythology, archaic formulas, and a number of hymns with early philosophical speculations. Composed by the poets of different clans, including famed Vedic rishis (sages) such as Vishvamitra and Vasishtha, these signify the power of prestige therewith to vac (speech, sound), a tradition set in place. The text introduced the prized concepts such as Rta (active realization of truth, cosmic harmony) which inspired the later Hindu concept of Dharma. The Rigvedic verses formulate this Rta as effected by Brahman, a significant and non-self-evident truth. The text also contains hymns of "highly poetical value"some in dialogue form, along with love stories that likely inspired later Epic and classical poets of Hinduism, states Witzel.

According to Nadkarni, several hymns of the Rigveda embed cherished virtues and ethical statements. For example, verses 5.82.7, 6.44.8, 9.113.4, 10.133.6 and 10.190.1 mention truthful speech, truthful action, self-discipline and righteousness. Hymn 10.117 presents the significance of charity and of generosity between human beings, how helping someone in need is ultimately in the self-interest of the helper, its importance to an individual and the society. According to Jamison and Brereton, hymns 9.112 and 9.113 poetically state, "what everyone [humans and all living beings] really want is gain or an easy life", even a water drop has a goalnamely, "simply to seek Indra". These hymns present the imagery of being in heaven as "freedom, joy and satisfaction", a theme that appears in the Hindu Upanishads to characterize their teachings of self-realization.

 Monism debate 
While the older hymns of the Rigveda reflect sacrificial ritual typical of polytheism, 
its younger parts, specifically mandalas 1 and 10, have been noted as containing monistic or henotheistic speculations.

A widely cited example of such speculations is hymn 1.164.46:

Max Müller notably introduced the term "henotheism" for the philosophy expressed here, avoiding the connotations of "monotheism"  in Judeo-Christian tradition.Garry Trompf (2005), In Search of Origins, 2nd Edition, Sterling, pp. 6061 
Other widely cited examples of monistic tendencies include hymns 1.164, 8.36 and 10.31,Franklin Edgerton (1996), The Bhagavad Gita, Cambridge University Press, Reprinted by Motilal Banarsidass, pp. 1112 Other scholars state that the Rigveda includes an emerging diversity of thought, including monotheism, polytheism, henotheism and pantheism, the choice left to the preference of the worshipper. and the Nasadiya Sukta (10.129), one of the most widely cited Rigvedic hymns in popular western presentations.

Ruse (2015) commented on the old discussion of "monotheism" vs. "henotheism" vs. "monism" by noting an "atheistic streak" in hymns such as 10.130.

Examples from Mandala 1 adduced to illustrate the "metaphysical" nature of the contents of the younger hymns include:
1.164.34:  "What is the ultimate limit of the earth?", "What is the center of the universe?", "What is the semen of the cosmic horse?", "What is the ultimate source of human speech?";
1.164.34: "Who gave blood, soul, spirit to the earth?", "How could the unstructured universe give origin to this structured world?";
1.164.5:  "Where does the sun hide in the night?", "Where do gods live?";
1.164.6:  "What, where is the unborn support for the born universe?";
1.164.20 (a hymn that is widely cited in the Upanishads as the parable of the Body and the Soul): "Two birds with fair wings, inseparable companions; Have found refuge in the same sheltering tree. One incessantly eats from the fig tree; the other, not eating, just looks on.".

Reception in Hinduism

Shruti
The Vedas as a whole are classed as "shruti" in Hindu tradition. This has been compared to the concept of divine revelation in Western religious tradition, but Staal argues that  "it is nowhere stated that the Veda was revealed", and that shruti simply means "that what is heard, in the sense that it is transmitted from father to son or from teacher to pupil". The Rigveda, or other Vedas, do not anywhere assert that they are apauruṣeyā, and this reverential term appears only centuries after the end of the Vedic period in the texts of the Mimamsa school of Hindu philosophy.D Sharma (2011), Classical Indian Philosophy: A Reader, Columbia University Press, pp. 196197 The text of the Rigveda suggests it was "composed by poets, human individuals whose names were household words" in the Vedic age, states Staal.

The authors of the  literature discussed and interpreted the Vedic ritual.

Sanskrit grammarians

Yaska (4th c. BCE), a lexicographer, was an early commentator of the Rigveda by discussing the meanings of difficult words. In his book titled Nirukta Yaska asserts that the Rigveda in the ancient tradition can be interpreted in three ways - from the perspective of religious rites (adhiyajna), from the perspective of the deities (adhidevata), and from the perspective of the soul (adhyatman). The fourth way to interpret the Rigveda also emerged in the ancient times, wherein the gods mentioned were viewed as symbolism for legendary individuals or narratives. It was generally accepted that creative poets often embed and express double meanings, ellipses and novel ideas to inspire the reader.

Medieval Hindu scholarship
By the period of Puranic Hinduism, in the medieval period, the language of the hymns had become "almost entirely unintelligible", and their interpretation mostly hinged on mystical ideas and sound symbolism.
Ram Gopal (1983), The History and Principles of Vedic Interpretation, Concept Publishing Company, ch.2 pp. 720

According to the Puranic tradition, Ved Vyasa compiled all the four Vedas, along with the Mahabharata and the Puranas. Vyasa then taught the Rigveda samhita to Paila, who started the oral tradition. An alternate version states that Shakala compiled the Rigveda from the teachings of Vedic rishis, and one of the manuscript recensions mentions Shakala.

Madhvacharya, a Hindu philosopher of the 13th century, provided a commentary of the first 40 hymns of the Rigveda in his book Rig Bhashyam. In the 14th century,  wrote an exhaustive commentary on the complete text of the Rigveda in his book Rigveda Samhita. This book was translated from Sanskrit to English by Max Müller in the year 1856. H.H. Wilson also translated this book into English as Rigveda Sanhita in the year 1856. Both Madvacharya and Sayanacharya studied at the Sringeri monastery.

A number of other commentaries (s) were written during the medieval period, including the commentaries by Skandasvamin (pre-Sayana, roughly of the Gupta period), Udgitha (pre-Sayana), Venkata-Madhava (pre-Sayana, c. 10th to 12th centuries) and Mudgala (after Sayana, an abbreviated version of Sayana's commentary).

Some notable commentaries from Medieval period include:

Arya Samaj and Aurobindo movements
In the 19th- and early 20th-centuries, reformers like Swami Dayananda Saraswati (founder of the Arya Samaj) and Sri Aurobindo (founder of Sri Aurobindo Ashram) discussed the philosophies of the Vedas. According to Robson, Dayananda believed "there were no errors in the Vedas (including the Rigveda), and if anyone showed him an error, he would maintain that it was a corruption added later".

According to Dayananda and Aurobindo the Vedic scholars had a monotheistic conception. Sri Aurobindo gave commentaries, general interpretation guidelines, and a partial translation in The secret of Veda (1946).{{refn|group=note|See }} Sri Aurobindo finds Sayana's interpretation to be ritualistic in nature, and too often having inconsistent interpretations of Vedic terms, trying to fit the meaning to a narrow mold. Accorording to Aurobindo, if Sayana's interepretation were to be accepted, it would seem as if the Rig Veda belongs to an unquestioning tradition of faith, starting from an original error. Aurobindo attempted to interpret hymns to Agni in the Rigveda as mystical. Aurobindo states that the Vedic hymns were a quest after a higher truth, define the Rta (basis of Dharma), conceive life in terms of a struggle between the forces of light and darkness, and sought the ultimate reality.

Contemporary Hinduism

The Rigveda, in contemporary Hinduism, has been a reminder of the ancient cultural heritage and point of pride for Hindus, with some hymns still in use in major rites of passage ceremonies, but the literal acceptance of most of the textual essence is long gone.Jeffrey Haines (2008), Routledge Handbook of Religion and Politics, Routledge, p. 80 Musicians and dance groups celebrate the text as a mark of Hindu heritage, through incorporating Rigvedic hymns in their compositions, such as in Hamsadhvani and Subhapantuvarali of Carnatic music, and these have remained popular among the Hindus for decades.

According to Axel Michaels, "most Indians today pay lip service to the Veda and have no regard for the contents of the text." According to Louis Renou, the Vedic texts are a distant object, and "even in the most orthodox domains, the reverence to the Vedas has come to be a simple raising of the hat". According to Andrea Pinkney, "the social history and context of the Vedic texts are extremely distant from contemporary Hindu religious beliefs and practice", and the reverence for the Vedas in contemporary Hinduism illustrates the respect among the Hindus for their heritage.

Hindu nationalism

The Rig Veda plays a role in the modern construction of a Hindu identity, portraying Hindus as the original inhabitants of India. The Rigveda has been referred to in the "Indigenous Aryans" and Out of India theory. Dating the Rig Veda as contemporaneous, or even preceding the Indus Valley civilisation, an argument is made that the IVC was Aryan, and the bearer of the Rig Veda.Edwin Bryant (2004), The Quest for the Origins of the Vedic Culture, Oxford University Press,  Indian nationalist Bal Gangadhar Tilak, in his Orion: Or Researches Into The Antiquity Of The Vedas (1893) has concluded that the date of composition of the Rigveda dates at least as far back as 60004000 BCE based on his astronomical research into the position of the constellation Orion. These theories are controversial, and not accepted or propagated in mainstream scholarship.Michael Witzel, The Pleiades and the Bears viewed from inside the Vedic texts, EVJS Vol. 5 (1999), issue 2 (December);;Bryant, Edwin and Laurie L. Patton (2005) The Indo-Aryan Controversy, Routledge/Curzon, 

Translations
The Rigveda is considered particularly difficult to translate, owing to its length, poetic nature, the language itself, and the absence of any close contemporary texts for comparison. Staal describes it as the most "obscure, distant and difficult for moderns to understand". As a result, he says, it "is often misinterpreted" – with many early translations containing straightforward errors – "or worse: used as a peg on which to hang an idea or a theory." Another issue is technical terms such as mandala, conventionally translated "book", but more literally rendered "cycle".A. A. MacDonnel (2000 print edition), India's Past: A Survey of Her Literatures, Religions, Languages and Antiquities, Asian Educational Services, p. 15 Karen Thomson, author of Ancient Sanskrit Online and editor of the Metrically Restored Text Online at the University of Texas at Austin, argues, as linguists in the nineteenth century had done (Friedrich Max Müller, Rudolf von Roth, William Dwight Whitney, Theodor Benfey, John Muir, Edward Vernon Arnold), that the apparent obscurity derives from the failure to discard a mass of assumptions about ritual meaning inherited from Vedic tradition.

The first published translation of any portion of the Rigveda in any European language was into Latin, by Friedrich August Rosen, working from manuscripts brought back from India by Colebrooke. In 1849, Max Müller published his six-volume translation into German, the first printed edition and most studied. H. H. Wilson was the first to make a translation of the Rig Veda into English, published from 185088.

Translations have since been made in several languages, including French and Russian. Karl Friedrich Geldner completed the first scholarly translation in the 1920s, which was published after his death. Translations of shorter cherrypicked anthologies have also been published, such as those by Wendy Doniger in 1981 and Walter Maurer in 1986, although Jamison and Brereton say they "tend to create a distorted view" of the text. In 1994, Barend A. van Nooten and Gary B. Holland published the first attempt to restore the entirety of the Rigveda to its poetic form, systematically identifying and correcting sound changes and sandhi combinations which had distorted the original metre and meaning. Karen Thomson and Jonathan Slocum (2006). Online edition of van Nooten and Holland's metrically restored text, University of Texas. https://lrc.la.utexas.edu/books/rigveda/RV00 

Some notable translations of the Rig Veda include:

See also
 
 

Notes

References

Bibliography

Editions
 
 
 
 editio princeps: Friedrich Max Müller, The Hymns of the Rigveda, with Sayana's commentary, London, 184975, 6 vols., 2nd ed. 4 vols., Oxford, 189092.
 Theodor Aufrecht, 2nd ed., Bonn, 1877.
 .
 B. van Nooten und G. Holland, Rig Veda, a metrically restored text, Department of Sanskrit and Indian Studies, Harvard University, Harvard University Press, Cambridge, Massachusetts and London, England, 1994.
 Rgveda-Samhita, Text in Devanagari, English translation Notes and indices by H. H. Wilson, Ed. W. F. Webster, originally in 1888, Published Nag Publishers 1990, 11A/U.A. Jawaharnagar, Delhi-7.

Commentary
 Sayana (14th century)
 ed. Müller 184975 (German translation);
 ed. Müller (original commentary of Sāyana in Sanskrit based on 24 manuscripts).
 ed. Sontakke et al., published by Vaidika Samsodhana Mandala, Pune (2nd ed. 1972) in 5 volumes.
 Rgveda-Samhitā Srimat-sāyanāchārya virachita--sametā, ed. by Sontakke et al., published by Vaidika Samśodhana Mandala, Pune-9, 1972, in 5 volumes (It is original commentary of Sāyana in Sanskrit based on over 60 manuscripts).
 
 Sri Aurobindo, Hymns to the Mystic Fire (Commentary on the Rig Veda), Lotus Press, Twin Lakes, Wisconsin  Rig Veda - Hymns to the Mystic Fire - Sri Aurobindo - INDEX
 Raimundo Pannikar (1972), The Vedic Experience, University of California Press

Philology

 Vashishtha Narayan Jha, A Linguistic Analysis of the Rgveda-Padapatha Sri Satguru Publications, Delhi (1992).
 Bjorn Merker, Rig Veda Riddles In Nomad Perspective, Mongolian Studies, Journal of the Mongolian Society XI, 1988.
 
 
—Die Religion des Veda. Berlin 1894; Stuttgart 1917; Stuttgart 1927; Darmstadt 1977
—Vedic Hymns, The Sacred Books of the East Vol l. 46 ed. Friedrich Max Müller, Oxford 1897
 Adolf Kaegi, The Rigveda: The Oldest Literature of the Indians (trans. R. Arrowsmith), Boston, Ginn and Co. (1886), 2004 reprint: .

Historical
 
 
 
 
 
 
 
 
 Lal, B.B. 2005. The Homeland of the Aryans. Evidence of Rigvedic Flora and Fauna & Archaeology, New Delhi, Aryan Books International.
 Talageri, Shrikant: The Rigveda: A Historical Analysis, 2000. 
 
 
 
 
 

External links

Text

 The Rig Veda The complete Rig Veda in English translation at holybooks.com
 Devanagari and transliteration experimental online text at: sacred-texts.com
 ITRANS, Devanagari, transliteration online text and PDF, several versions prepared by Detlef Eichler
 Transliteration, metrically restored  online text, at: Linguistics Research Center, Univ. of Texas
 The Hymns of the Rigveda'', Editio Princeps by Friedrich Max Müller (large PDF files of book scans). Two editions: London, 1877 (Samhita and Pada texts) and Oxford, 189092, with Sayana's commentary.
 Dictionary'
Rigvedic Dictionary by Hermann Grassmann (online database, uni-koeln.de)

 
2nd-millennium BC literature
Hindu texts
Memory of the World Register
Sources of ancient Iranian religion
Vedas